The Lunatic at Large is an 1899 comedy novel by the British writer J. Storer Clouston. A popular success, it was followed by three sequels The Lunatic at Large Again (1922), The Lunatic Still at Large (1923), and The Lunatic In Charge (1926).

Synopsis
Francis Beveridge escapes from a lunatic asylum and heads for London. There, at a luxury hotel he meets up with a travelling German baron and becomes his guide to the sights of England and its capital city.

Film adaptations
It has been made into films on two occasions, a 1921 British silent film directed by and starring Henry Edwards and a 1927 American silent film directed by Fred C. Newmeyer and starring Leon Errol, Dorothy Mackaill and Warren Cook.

References

Bibliography
 Goble, Alan. The Complete Index to Literary Sources in Film. Walter de Gruyter, 1999.
 Royle, Trevor. Macmillan Companion to Scottish Literature. Macmillan, 1984.

1899 British novels
Novels set in London
British comedy novels
Novels by J. Storer Clouston
British novels adapted into films
William Blackwood books